The British Independent Film Award for Breakthrough Performance is an annual award given by the British Independent Film Awards (BIFA). The award was first presented in the 1998 ceremony, until 2020 the category was presented as Most Promising Newcomer.

Actress Laila Morse was the first recipient of this award for her performance as Janet in Nil by Mouth. The category with a wider meaning of "newcomer", including new actors but also directors, cinematographers, editors, etc., since 2001 the category is directed towards only actors.

According to BIFA, the category is for "British performers taking their first significant role in a theatrical feature film", it also states that "eligibility of performers with significant theatre or TV credits will be determined by the Nomination Committee". The category includes both leading and supporting performances.

Winners and nominees

1990s
 Most Promising Newcomer

2000s
 Best Newcomer (On Screen)

 Best Newcomer (Off Screen)

 Most Promising Newcomer

2010s

2020s

See also
 BAFTA Rising Star Award

References

External links
 Official website

British Independent Film Awards